Torchil de Bovington (or Boynton) was an 11th-century landowner in Norman England.

William the Conqueror's Domesday survey of England was taken in 1086, listing both those who had land before the Norman Conquest of 1066 and who held it in 1086. Torchil (or Turchil) is mentioned as a landowner sixty-four times. He held over 60 manors, either alone or in conjunction with others, and almost all were located in Yorkshire.

References

External links
 http://www.boyntons.us/yorkshire/stories/torchil.html

Anglo-Normans
People from Yorkshire
11th-century English landowners